Jerzy Schindler (5 February 1923 – 10 May 1992) was a Polish alpine skier. He competed in two events at the 1948 Winter Olympics.

References

1923 births
1992 deaths
Polish male alpine skiers
Olympic alpine skiers of Poland
Alpine skiers at the 1948 Winter Olympics
Sportspeople from Zakopane
20th-century Polish people